is a Japanese manga series written and illustrated by Sōsuke Kaise, published by Kadokawa Shoten's Shōnen Ace in 2003.

The manga was adapted into an animated television series in 2004. The anime series aired on WOWOW from October 14, 2004 to January 13, 2005, totaling twelve episodes.

Plot 

Grenadier follows the travels of Rushuna Tendō, an expert gunfighter, and the samurai Yajirō Kojima, a mercenary swordsman. A Senshi or "Enlightened" is one who is skilled to some degree in the use of guns. The series begins with Yajirō and a small army of samurai launching a frontal assault against a fort in an attempt to free their lord, which was taken over by a group of gunners. The assault fails.

Yajirō orders a retreat, but is spotted by the enemy and chased to a small cliff, which he jumps off of to escape. With his pursuers still following, he follows a nearby hot-water stream upcurrent where he finds Rushuna bathing in a hot spring. She seems undisturbed by his presence or her own nudity and hides him in the hot spring with her ample breasts as cover until the enemy passes them by. After this, she introduces herself as a traveler and reveals the ultimate battle strategy to Yajirō; to avoid battle by removing an enemy's will to fight.

Hearing the gunfire of the renewed assault upon the fort, Yajirō leaves Rushuna to rejoin combat. He arrives in time to see the leader of the gunners use a Gatling gun to decimate the samurai. Rushuna also arrives at this point and shows her considerable gun talent and effectively ends the battle by defeating the lead gunner and rescuing the lord by herself.

Something in him changing, Yajirō decides to become Rushuna's partner and travel with her.

During their travels, Rushuna and Yajirō face a mysterious masked figure known only as "The Jester" who is responsible for a weapon called "Enlightened Evil". Then they discover that Tenshi, who sent Rushuna to travel in order to learn the "Ultimate Battle Strategy", had apparently put a price on her head. Joined by a young girl named Mikan Kurenai, a balloon maker, Rushuna and Yajirō make their way to the capital of Tento. Along the way they overcome many of the Juttensen, Tenshi's elite personal bodyguard.

When the three reach Tento they discover the truth and the final showdown against the Jester begins.

Media

Manga
Grenadier was published in Kadokawa Shoten's Shōnen Ace in 2003.

In North America, the manga was licensed by Tokyopop and its first volume was published in August 2006.

The manga was licensed in Taiwan by Ever Glory Publishing.

Anime 
 was adapted by Studio Live into an anime television series comprising 12 episodes. It began airing on WOWOW from October 14, 2004 till January 13, 2005.

Reception
Manga
"If you prefer your action stories free of humor and completely serious then this series isn't for you. But if you like the idea of a skimpily-clad lead female character who reloads her revolver by bouncing six bullets out of her cleavage and loading them into her gun in midair then you should check out this title." — Matthew Alexander, Mania.
"Yes, Rushuna is eye-candy and there are plenty of upskirt shots to keep most otaku happy, but she's also a complete badass with a gun. Hopefully future volumes will develop her character more so this isn't all we have to judge her on." — A. E. Sparrow, IGN.
Anime
"The character of Yajiro is a refreshing change from the typical male sidekick seen in this genre. Rushuna's character is not quite as appealing at the start, but her ties to the underlying main plot, along with the plot itself, have great potential." — Luis Cruz, Mania.
"Well, Rushuna seems to have a penchant for baths and hotsprings, which means nudity of the non-explicit variety. There are also a lot of battles and fights, which does lead to red shirt death and bleeding wounds. Things never get really messy, though, so the show is probably fine for teenagers." — Stig Høgset, T.H.E.M. Anime Reviews.

References

External links
Tokyopop's Grenadier website via the Wayback Machine
Kadokawa Shoten page
Ehrgeiz page
WOWOW page

2004 anime television series debuts
Anime Works
Anime series based on manga
Comedy anime and manga
Girls with guns anime and manga
Group TAC
Kadokawa Shoten manga
Shōnen manga
Tokyopop titles
Western (genre) anime and manga
Wowow original programming